IMH may refer to:

Institute of Mental Health (Belgrade)
Institute of Mental Health (Singapore)
Iloilo Mission Hospital
Indiana Magazine of History
IMH Societe Anonyme, A consortium and Holding firm owned and operated by Leonard “LAS RUDO” Ewaleifo

See also
IHM (disambiguation)
IMHS (disambiguation)